Hilary Teague (1802 – May 21, 1853), sometimes written as Hilary Teage, was a Liberian merchant, journalist, and politician in the early years of the West African nation of Liberia. A native of the state of Virginia in the United States, he was known for his oratory skills and was prominent in early Liberian colonial politics. A leading advocate for Liberian independence from the American Colonization Society, he drafted the Liberian Declaration of Independence in 1847, serving as both a senator and the first Secretary of State for the new nation in the years that followed.

Early life
Teague was born free in Virginia, United States, in 1805. His mother was Frances Teague and his father Colin Teague,  a former slave who became a Baptist missionary during early efforts to establish the colony of Liberia. The family emigrated to West Africa in 1821.

Hilary Teague also served as a Baptist minister in Monrovia and was a merchant trading in palm oil. In 1835, Teague became the owner and editor of the Liberia Herald in Monrovia after John Brown Russwurm left to become governor of the Republic of Maryland. As editor, Teague became a dedicated promoter of Liberian independence and combined republicanism, black nationalism, and Christianity to make his case. He remained the newspaper's head until 1849, when he left to devote full attention to politics.

Political career
In 1835, Teague became Colonial Secretary for the Liberian colony. In 1839, he was the clerk of the convention which presented the settlers' views to the American Colonization Society regarding constitutional reform. He was later an instrumental figure at the Constitutional Convention of 1847—representing Montserrado County—in both debating and ratifying the Liberian Constitution of 1847. He also wrote the Liberian Declaration of Independence, which protested against the treatment of African Americans as slaves and second-class citizens in the United States. Teague became the republic's first Secretary of State after Liberia declared independence in 1847. Teague also composed Liberia's hymn of independence.

He died in Liberia on May 21, 1853, and at the time was the country's attorney general.

References

External links
Masterpieces of Negro Eloquence — Alice Moore Dunbar-Nelson
Lectures on Slavery, and Its Remedy — Amos Augustus Phelps, Massachusetts Anti-Slavery Society
Virginia Emigrants to Liberia

1853 deaths
1802 births
Members of the Senate of Liberia
People from Virginia
Foreign Ministers of Liberia
Americo-Liberian people
Attorneys general of Liberia
Liberian journalists
Liberian Baptists
Liberian businesspeople
Politicians from Monrovia
Signatories of the Liberian Declaration of Independence
19th-century journalists
Male journalists
19th-century male writers
Liberian independence activists
American colonization movement
19th-century Baptists
19th-century Liberian politicians